Maryknoll School is a private, coeducational Catholic school serving children in kindergarten through twelfth grade in Honolulu, Hawaii. The school is located on the island of Oahu and is administered by the Diocese of Honolulu in association with its original founders, the Maryknoll Society of brothers and priests and the Maryknoll Congregation also called the Maryknoll Sisters. The school is the largest Catholic School in the state of Hawaii, and the fifth largest private school in the state. As one of the unique features of the school, Maryknoll has developed 6 sister schools and 5 affiliated school connections, in China, Japan, and Vietnam. Maryknoll's International Programs promote cultural awareness, community service, and global citizenship. These programs fulfill Maryknoll School's mission to create 21st-century learners, leaders, and citizens of character, and to put to practice Noblesse Oblige. In 2017, Maryknoll started the first Chinese Immersion Program in the state of Hawaii, allowing students to learn the world's most widely spoken first language, creating global opportunities for educational and career aspirations.

The school started out as a one-story wood-frame building containing four classrooms. It was blessed and dedicated in 1927 and opened with a student body of 93 boys and 77 girls in the lower grade levels. The six Maryknoll Sisters, who had arrived from New York just four days before opening day, comprised the first faculty.

Maryknoll School spent its first few years further refining its mission, vision, and purpose. The Maryknoll Sisters believed in education as a choice between different educational styles and should be open to all residents of Hawaii no matter what background or faith tradition. It pioneered Catholic education in the American vision that the Maryknoll Sisters developed, as opposed to the traditional European-based education, such as those at Sacred Hearts Academy and Saint Louis School. They invited all residents of Hawaii to send their children to Maryknoll School for a uniquely American type of Catholic education. In 1931, the Maryknoll Sisters expanded the school to accommodate older students; in 1935, Maryknoll School graduated its first class. As of the 2017 - 2018 school year, Maryknoll School has a student body of nearly 1,100 students.

See also
Maryknoll

References

External links
Official website
Maryknoll Alumni Resources

Roman Catholic Diocese of Honolulu
Catholic secondary schools in Hawaii
Educational institutions established in 1927
Maryknoll schools
Schools in Honolulu
1927 establishments in Hawaii